Alexandr Dolgopolov was the defending champion, but withdrew before the tournament began.

Dominic Thiem won the title, defeating Aljaž Bedene in the final, 6–2, 6–4.

Seeds
The top four seeds receive a bye into the second round.

Draw

Finals

Top half

Bottom half

Qualifying

Seeds

Qualifiers

Lucky losers
  Gastão Elias

Qualifying draw

First qualifier

Second qualifier

Third qualifier

Fourth qualifier

External links
 Main draw
 Qualifying draw

2018 ATP World Tour
2018 Singles